The San Michele Oratory or Oratory of San Michele (Italian - Oratorio di San Michele) is an oratory chapel in Padova, Italy. The interior is painted with a cycle of frescoes on the life of the Virgin Mary by Jacopo da Verona.

History

Origins
It first arose near the Torlonga del Castello Carrarese, outside the ancient Roman walls of the city. It was built in 1397 over the ruins of the Santi Arcangeli church, which had been renamed San Michele by the Lombards, who proclaimed Michael the Archangel "patron of Italy" after their victory over the Byzantine Empire The earlier church had been damaged in 1390 by a fire triggered by clashes between the Carraresi and Visconti during Francesco Novello da Carrara's siege of the city. After the city's fall, the Bovi family decided to build a chapel dedicated to the Virgin Mary, opening a gap in the north side of the old church's nave. An inscription on the interior wall beside the chapel entrance gives the date of construction as 1397, the commissioner of the building as Pietro di Bartolomeo de Bovi and the painter's name Jacopo da Verona:

Later changes

Restoration

Frescoes

References

Bibliography (in Italian) 
 C. Bellinati, Padova da salvare: l'antica Chiesa dei Santi Arcangeli (S. Michele) in Padova e la Cappella affrescata da Jacopo da Verona (1397), Padova 1969, Civica BP.h.322.59
 Giotto e i cicli pittorici del Trecento a Padova, a cura di D. Banzato, M. Masenello, G. Valenzano, Milano 2015, pp. 113–117
 Banzato Davide, Jacopo da Verona e la Cappella di S. Maria, in "Padova e il suo territorio", Anno XXIII, 196 (nov/dic2018)
 Bibbia istoriata padovana della fine del Trecento: Pentateuco, Giosue, Ruth / a cura di Gianfranco Folena e Gian Lorenzo Mellini, 1962
 Duò Chiara, Nuovi contributi sugli affreschi della Cappella Bovi a San Michele, "Padova e il suo territorio", 26 (2011)
 Massimi Maria Elena, Jacopo da Verona, in Dizionario biografico degli italiani, vol. 62, Roma, Istituto dell'Enciclopedia Italiana, 2004
 Mori Giovanna, Jacopo da Verona, in "Padova e il suo territorio", Anno XVI, 90 (aprile 2001)/2001
 Mori Giovanna, Jacopo da Verona, in Giotto e il suo tempo, a cura di V. Sgarbi, Milano, 2000

External links
 
 

Roman Catholic churches in Padua
Roman Catholic chapels in Italy
Gothic architecture in Veneto
14th-century Roman Catholic church buildings in Italy